Mireia Riera Casanovas (born in Lloret de Mar, Barcelona) is an S7 swimmer from Spain. She has cerebral palsy. She competed at the 1996 Summer Paralympics, winning a silver medal in the 100 meter freestyle race, and a bronze medal in the 400 meter freestyle race.

References 

Living people
1975 births
Swimmers from Barcelona
Paralympic swimmers of Spain
Spanish female freestyle swimmers
Spanish female medley swimmers
Paralympic bronze medalists for Spain
Paralympic silver medalists for Spain
Paralympic medalists in swimming
Swimmers at the 1996 Summer Paralympics
Medalists at the 1996 Summer Paralympics
S7-classified Paralympic swimmers